TRIMU-5 is a selective agonist of the μ2-opioid receptor and antagonist of the μ1-opioid receptor. It produces analgesia in animals that differs from that of conventional μ-opioid receptor agonists but that can still be blocked by μ-opioid receptor antagonists. TRIMU-5 can also block the analgesic effects of μ-opioid receptor agonists like morphine. In addition to analgesia, TRIMU-5 inhibits gastrointestinal transit, a known effect of μ2-opioid receptor activation.

References

Mu-opioid receptor agonists
Opioid peptides